Ronald Joseph Harvey (11 November 1935 – 25 October 1991) was an Australian rules footballer who played with Fitzroy in the VFL.

Family
The son of Joseph Henry Harvey (1897-1969), and Elizabeth Agnes Harvey (1903-1973), née Morris, Ronald Joseph Harvey, was born at Annandale, New South Wales, on 11 November 1935.

He married Patricia Anne Dillon (1938-) in 1957. They had four children.

Fitzroy (VFL)
Harvey, who worked his way up from the Thirds and the Seconds, making his senior debut against Richmond, at the Brunswick Street Oval on 12 June 1954, played most of his career as a ruckman but was also used, on occasion, as a forward.

In 1959 he won Fitzroy's best and fairest award; in 1962 he finished equal sixth in the Brownlow Medal (along with Brian Gray, Verdun Howell, and Bob Skilton); and he represented Victoria twice in his career.

1959 Night premiership

He was a member of Fitzroy's 1959 Night Premiership team.

1963 Miracle Match

On 6 July 1963, playing at centre half-forward, he was captain of the young and inexperienced Fitzroy team that comprehensively and unexpectedly defeated Geelong, 9.13 (67) to 3.13 (31) in the 1963 Miracle Match.

After Fitzroy
From 1964 to 1966 he played, as captain-coach, with the Wodonga Football Club in the Ovens & Murray Football League (OMFL), winning the Club's Best and Fairest Award in 1964.

In 1967 he was the captain-coach of the Coolamon Football Club in the Riverina's South West Football League (New South Wales) (SWDFL).

Death
He died at Ballarat, Victoria on 25 October 1991.

See also
 1959 Night Series Cup
 1963 Miracle Match
 Winners: Wodonga Football Club's Best and Fairest

Notes

References

External links
 
 Profile at Fitzroy website

References
 Ronald Joseph Harvey (11 Nov 1935 - 25 Oct 1991), at Billion Graves.

1935 births
1991 deaths
Australian rules footballers from Victoria (Australia)
Fitzroy Football Club players
Mitchell Medal winners